Valentine Snow (c. 1700 – December 1770) was the trumpeter for George Frideric Handel. 

In 1745 Snow and his wife Mary had a daughter named Sophia when he was the sergeant-trumpeter to George II. She was trained for a musical career and after she eloped she found fame as Sophia Baddeley.

Snow succeeded John Shore as the primary trumpeter of England during the mid-to-late 18th century, which automatically made him the most respected trumpeter in the country.  Many of the trumpet parts in the music of Handel were written specifically for him.

References

English trumpeters
Male trumpeters
Year of birth missing
1770 deaths